Ramdeen Ramjattan, known as John Agitation (24 July 1927 – 5 February 2018), was a Trinidadian comedian, civil servant, politician and storyteller.  He was a graduate of the Progressive Educational Institute and served in the Trinidad and Tobago Civil Service.  He was also the first comedian in the Commonwealth of Nations to win an election.

In 1951, at 24, Ramdeen was introduced to the Trinbagonian national audience by Landy de Montbrun, a leading local comic at the time. He told a joke, slightly nervous that he was crossing the boundary of taste. But the crowd was elated. "They were very happy to see a (dark-skinned) fella," Agitation later remarked.

From there, Agitation became a regular on Radio Trinidad, particularly the Horace James Comedy Hour, Sunday Serenade (hosted by Sam Ghany)  and the Aunty Kay Children's Show. The latter was sponsored by Bermudez Biscuit Company Limited for decades. He performed in many venues in Trinidad and Tobago as the headline performer, often to sold-out shows.

Throughout his life he was an avid hunter, as his home was in the rural, still-forested area of Cumuto, with a large population of agouti and brocket deer. He farmed oranges, mandarins, tangelos, portugals (clementines) and grapefruit on his 10-acre estate.

He was the first candidate to run on a United National Congress (UNC) ticket: he contested and won a 1989 by-election in the Sangre Grande Regional Corporation for the Guaico-Cumuto district, thus becoming the first comedian in the Commonwealth of Nations to win an election.

Agi, as he was known in Trinbago, retired, lived on his public service pension, but still performed occasionally until his death in 2018. In 2003, Ramdeen "John Agitation" Ramjattan was awarded the Hummingbird Medal (Silver) by the government of Trinidad and Tobago, for his more than five-decade-long work to preserve Trinbagonian and Caribbean folklore via comedic storytelling.

References

External links
ChutneyZone Artiste's Profiles

1927 births
2018 deaths
Storytellers
Male comedians
Trinidad and Tobago radio presenters
Recipients of the Hummingbird Medal